Season three of So You Think You Can Dance Australia, the Australian version of the American reality dance-off series So You Think You Can Dance, was hosted by former Rogue Traders vocalist and solo artist Natalie Bassingthwaighte, with Jason Coleman, Matt Lee and Bonnie Lythgoe acting as the judges. It premiered on 31 January 2010. Robbie Kmetoni was announced as the winner on 21 April 2010 and the first season that each of the contestants have all been in the bottom three or four. It was the last season of So You Think You Can Dance Australia to air until the show came back in 2014.

Auditions

Auditions for the third season were held between September and October 2009 in Perth, Brisbane, Melbourne, Adelaide and Sydney.

Top 20 Contestants

Female contestants

Male contestants

Results table

 According to the So You Think You Can Dance Australia website Jessica Prince was forced to leave the competition due to a back injury.  Pursuant to the rules, Jess Stokes, as the last female dancer eliminated, was brought back into the competition.

Performances

Top 20 Showcase (10 February 2010)
No voting this week in order to give the dancers the chance to showcase themselves in their own styles

Judges: Jason Coleman, Bonnie Lythgoe and Matt Lee

Week 1: Top 20 Performance (17 February 2010)
Judges: Jason Coleman, Bonnie Lythgoe and Matt Lee

Week 2: Top 18 Performance (24 February 2010)
Judges: Jason Coleman, Bonnie Lythgoe, Matt Lee and Jason Gilkison

Week 3: Top 16 Performance (3 March 2010)
Judges: Jason Coleman, Bonnie Lythgoe, Matt Lee and Mary Murphy

 Guest Dancers: Sydney Dance Company

Week 4: Top 14 Performance (10 March 2010)
Judges: Jason Coleman, Bonnie Lythgoe, Matt Lee and Kelley Abbey

Week 4: Top 14 Results (11 March 2010)
 Group Dance: "Rhythm Nation" – Janet Jackson (Hip hop; Choreographer: Juliette Verne)
 Musical Guests: "When Love Takes Over"—Kelly Rowland
 Solos

 Phillipe Witana: "SexyBack"— Justin Timberland
 Matt Geronimi: "Hey Ya!" — Outkast
 Don Napalan: "My Sharona"—The Knack
 Renee Ritchie: "Walk Away"— Christina Aguilera
 Jessie Hesketh: "Tainted Love" — Marilyn Manson
 Issi Durant: "Buttons" — Sia
 Eliminated
 Issi Durant
 Don Napalan
 New Partners
 None

Week 5: Top 12 Performance (17 March 2010)
Judges: Jason Coleman, Bonnie Lythgoe, Matt Lee

Week 5: Top 12 Results (18 March 2010)
 Group Dance: 'Serial Thrilla' by The Prodigy (Contemporary; Choreographer: Garry Stewart & Larrisa McGowan)
 Musical Guests: "Good Girls Go Bad"—Cobra Starship
 Solos
 Jess Stokes: "Like A Drug"— Kylie Minogue
 Jessica Prince: "Malagueña" — Brian Setzer
 Renee Ritchie: "You'll Find A Way (remix)"—Santigold
 Nick Geurts: "For Your Entertainment"— Adam Lambert
 Heath Keating: "Where the City Meets the Sea" — The Getaway Plan
 Phillipe Witana: The Circle of Life — Carmen Twillie & Lebo M
 Eliminated
 Renee Ritchie
 Heath Keating

Week 6: Top 10 Performance (24 March 2010)
Judges: Jason Coleman, Bonnie Lythgoe, Matt Lee, Jason Gilkison

Week 6: Top 10 Results (25 March 2010)
 Group Dance: "Tanguera" by Mariano Mores (Tango; Choreographer: Jason Gilkison)
 Musical Guests: "Blah Blah Blah"—Ke$ha
 Solos
 Matt Geremoni: "Use Somebody"— Kings of Leon
 Kieran McMahon: "Tango De Los Asesinos (Assassin’s Tango)" — John Powell from Mr. & Mrs. Smith
 Jess Stokes: "Like The Sea" – Alicia Keys
 Jessica Prince:  "You're the Boss" — Ann-Margret & Elvis Presley
 Eliminated
 Jess Stokes
 Matt Geronimi

Week 7: Top 8 Performance (31 March 2010)
Judges: Jason Coleman, Bonnie Lythgoe, Matt Lee

Note: According to the So You Think You Can Dance Australia website Jessica Prince was forced to leave the competition due to a back injury. Pursuant to the rules, Jess Stokes, as the last female dancer eliminated, was brought back into the competition.

Week 7: Top 8 Results (1 April 2010)
 Group Dance: "Breathe Me" by Sia (Contemporary; Choreographer: Debbie Ellis)
 Musical Guests: "On a Mission" – Gabriella Cilmi
 Guest Dancers: Chunky Move
 Solos
 Jess Stokes: "Shy" – Ani Difranco
 Carly Cooper Smith: "Cold Case Love" – Rihanna
 Phillipe Witana: "Gone" – N'Sync
 Kieran McMahon:  "Into The Night" – Santana
 Eliminated
 Carly Cooper Smith
 Kieran McMahon

Week 8: Top 6 Performance (7 April 2010)
Judges: Jason Coleman, Bonnie Lythgoe, Matt Lee

Week 8: Top 6 Results (8 April 2010)
 Group Dance: "Push Up" by Freestylers (Hip Hop; Choreographer: Supple)
 Musical Guests: "In My Head" – Jason Derülo
 Guest Dancers: Sydney Dance Company
 Solos
 Ivy Heeney:  Creator – Santigold
 Jess Stokes: Hide and Seek – Imogen Heap
 Jessie Hesketh: Your House – Alanis Morissette
 Nick Geurts: Faint  – Linkin Park
 Robbie Kmetoni: Joker and the Thief – Wolfmother
 Phillipe Witana: Smooth Criminal – Michael Jackson
 Eliminated
 Jess Stokes
 Nick Geurts

Week 9: Top 4 Performance (14 April 2010)
Judges: Jason Coleman, Bonnie Lythgoe, Matt Lee and Tyce Diorio

 Solos
 Phillipe Witana:  "Got to be Real" – Cheryl Lynn
 Ivy Heeney:  "Missionary Man" – Eurythmics
 Jessie Hesketh: "Nothing Compares 2 U" – Sinéad O'Connor
 Robbie Kmetoni: "Smells Like Teen Spirit" – Nirvana

Week 10 (21 April 2010)
4th Place
Phillipe Witana
3rd Place
Ivy Heeney
Runner-Up:
Jessie Hesketh
Winner:
Robbie Kmetoni

Result shows

Week 1 (18 February 2010)
 Group Dance: "Everybody"—Martin Solveig (Jazz; Choreographer: Kelley Abbey)
 Guest Dancers: Bangarra
 Musical Guests: "You Belong with Me"—Taylor Swift
 Solos

 Eliminated
 Will Centurion
 Ilona Fabiszewski
 New Partners
 Nick Geurts
 Grace Stewart

Week 2 (25 February 2010)
 Group Dance: "Cinema Italiano"—Kate Hudson (Ballroom; Choreographer: Jason Gilkison)
 Musical Guests: "Love Long Distance"—Gossip
 Guest Dancers: "Burn for you" – Anya Garnis & Pasha Kovalev
 Solos

 Eliminated
 Gaz Griffiths
 Mikhaela Gregory
 New Partners
 Robbie Kmetoni
 Ivy Heeney

Week 3 (4 March 2010)
 Group Dance: "Fire & Water"—Christine Anu (Contemporary; Choreographer: Stephen Page)
 Musical Guests: "Whataya Want From Me"—Adam Lambert
 Solos

 Eliminated
 Grace Stewart
 Doug De Voogt
 New Partners
 Jess Stokes
 Nick Guerts

References

External links
 
 So You Think You Can Dance, Sydney Dance Company Studios teachers and dancers

2010 Australian television seasons
Season 03